Marco Spangenberg (born 28 August 1980) is a German sport shooter who competed in the 2004 Summer Olympics.

References

1980 births
Living people
German male sport shooters
ISSF pistol shooters
Olympic shooters of Germany
Shooters at the 2004 Summer Olympics